23 Marina is an 88-story,  residential skyscraper in Dubai, United Arab Emirates. As of 2022, it is the fourth tallest building in Dubai and the sixth tallest residential building in the world.

The tower has 57 swimming pools and each duplex in the tower is equipped with its own private elevator.

The building was 79 percent sold before construction started. The raft was completed on 30 April 2007.

Construction gallery

See also
Dubai Marina

References

External links

 Hircon-me.com
 Images of 23 Marina Construction Update

Residential skyscrapers in Dubai
Futurist architecture
Architecture in Dubai
High-tech architecture
Postmodern architecture
Residential buildings completed in 2012
2012 establishments in the United Arab Emirates